Hector Cornejo Chavez (Arequipa, November 15, 1918 - Lima, July 11, 2012) was a Peruvian politician, jurist and writer. Attorney, family law expert, founder of the Christian Democrat Party in Peru.

See also 
 Luis Bedoya Reyes

Bibliography 
Hugo Neira, "Peru" in JP Bernard et al., Guide to the Political Parties of South America, Harmondsworth: Penguin, 1973

References

External links 
 90 años de vida

1918 births
2012 deaths
People from Arequipa
20th-century Peruvian lawyers
Peruvian politicians
Christian Democrat Party (Peru) politicians